Hümmel is a municipality in the district of Ahrweiler, in Rhineland-Palatinate, Germany.

The municipality has a forest of ancient beeches. It employs the forester and author Peter Wohlleben, who operates an ecologically sensitive burial ground there to generate funds for maintenance and protection of the forest.

He gives talks and publishes books to increase public understanding of trees and their interdependence.

References

Populated places in Ahrweiler (district)